Charles Wycliffe Joiner (February 14, 1916 – March 10, 2017) was a United States district judge of the United States District Court for the Eastern District of Michigan.

Education and career

Born on February 14, 1916, in Maquoketa, Iowa, Joiner received a Bachelor of Arts degree from the University of Iowa in 1937 and a Juris Doctor from the University of Iowa College of Law in 1939. He was in private practice in Des Moines, Iowa from 1939 to 1947. He was in the United States Army Air Forces as a Lieutenant during World War II, from 1943 to 1945. He was a member of the faculty of University of Michigan Law School from 1947 to 1965. He was an associate dean for the University of Michigan Law School from 1960 to 1968. He was acting dean of the University of Michigan Law School from 1965 to 1966. He was an Alderman for the City of Ann Arbor, Michigan, from 1955 to 1959. He was director of research and drafting for the Constitutional Convention of the State of Michigan from 1961 to 1962. He was a dean and professor of law at Wayne State University in Detroit, Michigan from 1967 to 1972. He was a lecturer in law for the University of Michigan Law School from 1974 to 1984.

Federal judicial service

On April 25, 1972, Joiner was nominated by President Richard Nixon to a seat on the United States District Court for the Eastern District of Michigan vacated by Judge Talbot Smith. He was confirmed by the United States Senate on June 8, 1972, and received his commission on June 9, 1972. He assumed senior status on August 15, 1984. He turned 100 in February 2016 and died on March 10, 2017, in Naples, Florida, at the age of 101.

References

Sources
 

1916 births
2017 deaths
American centenarians
Men centenarians
Judges of the United States District Court for the Eastern District of Michigan
Iowa lawyers
Michigan city council members
Military personnel from Iowa
People from Maquoketa, Iowa
United States Army officers
United States Army Air Forces officers
United States district court judges appointed by Richard Nixon
University of Iowa alumni
University of Iowa College of Law alumni
University of Michigan Law School faculty
Wayne State University faculty
20th-century American judges
United States Army Air Forces personnel of World War II